Roosevelt High School is a public school in the Natrona County School District in Casper, Wyoming, United States. It is an alternative high school that provides small classes, credit recovery, and college courses for students in grades nine through twelve. About 200 students attend the school.

Roosevelt is home to a unique personal and social responsibility program, in which students and staff members exercise in small-group settings.

References

External links
School website

Public high schools in Wyoming
Schools in Natrona County, Wyoming
Buildings and structures in Casper, Wyoming